Hurt Hardy, Jr. (November 4, 1904 – February 26, 1937) was one of the last people to be executed by hanging in Missouri. While his execution is often cited as "the last public execution in the United States," that distinction actually went to Rainey Bethea, who was hanged in Kentucky on August 14, 1936.

Crime

Hurt Hardy was convicted of the murder of Ethel Fahnestock, with whom he was "very much in love," according to one of his appeals after his death sentence.  Fahnestock did not reciprocate his affections and wished to sever ties with Hardy, and Hardy refused to accept that Fahnestock was not interested in him, determining that "the only way out was to take [his] own life and take her with [him]". His motive was rooted in jealousy and possessiveness; he did not wish to see her with any other men, considering that she had rejected him.

Therefore, Hardy hatched a plan to lie in wait for Fahnestock. She had a morning chore of milking cows for her family, and Hardy waited several mornings for her to do so and to be alone so he could kill her. One morning, Hardy determined that Fahnestock was at too far of a distance for him to strike. The next morning, Fahnestock was accompanied by her younger brother, and Hardy did not wish to hurt Ethel in the presence of her brother. Finally, on September 28, 1935, Hardy found Fahnestock alone, sitting on a stool and milking the family cows. He approached her and shot her. The first shot did not seriously injure Fahnestock and she tried to escape, so he shot her twice more. The last two shots proved to be fatal.

Trial
Hardy attempted to make a guilty plea to the crime of murder to avoid a trial by jury. The court rejected the plea and directed him to enter a plea of not guilty. This required him to have a jury trial.

At trial, medical testimony revealed that Hardy was suffering from a severe case of syphilis at the time that he murdered Ethel Fahnestock. He tried to use his sickness in his defense, arguing that he "wasn’t all there" because he suffered from the severest degree of the disease. The defense failed, and on November 8, 1935, Hardy was convicted of first-degree murder. Exactly one week later, on November 15, he was formally sentenced to death.

Execution

After several failed appeals, Hurt Hardy's execution was scheduled for February 26, 1937. It ultimately took place on that date in Ste. Genevieve, Missouri. Hardy's execution is often cited as the "last public execution in the United States" since the execution that usually earns that distinction, that of Rainey Bethea in Owensboro, Kentucky, took place in August 1936. However, Hardy's execution was not actually public at all, as images of the hanging show that officials built a 16-foot tall wooden enclosure around the gallows on which Hardy was hanged. Public executions are those which can be viewed by anybody who wishes to do so. The purpose of the enclosure was to ensure that only those authorized to view the execution would be present.

Even though Hardy's execution was not formally public, between 200 and 400 people witnessed it anyway after gaining unauthorized access into the enclosure. There were a further 500 people crowded outside of the walled enclosure in which Hardy was executed who were not permitted entry, "barred from witnessing" the hanging. Presiding over the execution was renowned hangman G. Phil Hanna, who very frequently assisted with and supervised hangings, especially in the midwest, in the 1920s and 1930s. Interestingly, he had also been asked to supervise the hanging of Rainey Bethea.

By the time Hardy was executed, most states had moved away from executions being carried out in individual counties, and Missouri would very soon follow suit. Hurt Hardy was not the last person to be executed by hanging in an individual county in Missouri, however. Three more men would die on county gallows in the state - Fred Adams on April 2, 1937; Roscoe Jackson on May 21, 1937; and Dudley Barr on May 21, 1937 - before Missouri lawmakers would pass legislation in September of the same year to replace hanging with the gas chamber. The private gas chamber would be permanently housed in the Missouri State Penitentiary in Jefferson City, and the state would use its gas chamber for all executions from 1938 to 1965.

See also
Rainey Bethea, publicly executed in 1936 in front of a much larger crowd.

References

External links
 

1904 births
1937 deaths
American people convicted of murder
People executed for murder
People from St. Francois County, Missouri
20th-century executions by Missouri
People executed by Missouri by hanging
20th-century executions of American people
Publicly executed people
1936 murders in the United States